Rebecca Atkinson (born 22 September 1983) is an English actress, known for portraying Karen Maguire in Shameless from 2004 until 2013.

Early life and education
Atkinson studied theatre and dance at Preston College.

Career
Before her television appearances, Atkinson attended the David Johnson Drama and taught dancing in Goostrey for the Glenda Ann School of Dancing.

In 2004, Atkinson began playing Karen Maguire in Channel 4's popular comedy drama series, Shameless, and appeared in all 11 series. She has also appeared in Life On Mars, Ideal and BBC Three sitcom Trexx and Flipside. In October 2016, Atkinson joined the cast of BBC Scotland soap opera, River City, as Belinda Roberts.

She has had minor parts in many shows, including playing Asia in four episodes of BBC comedy series Ideal, and two episodes of New Street Law, where she played a character named Susie Hardwick. She appeared in Heartbeat in 2002 and 2006 playing two different characters. She has also had single appearances in Life on Mars, Holby City, The Bill, Coronation Street, Doctors and The Royal. She appeared in Children's Ward. She also appeared in the film adaptation of Kevin Sampson's Awaydays, released in 2009. She has now had a role in Wait For Me (2023) playing Lisa.

Personal life
Her partner is Shameless co-star, Ben Batt, who played Joe Pritchard. They met on the set in 2008 and shared numerous storylines together. In 2016, she gave birth to their son.

Filmography

References

External links

Living people
1983 births
English television actresses
Actresses from Lancashire
Actresses from Salford
21st-century English actresses